Ducktown may refer to:

Ducktown, Georgia, an unincorporated community
Ducktown, Tennessee, a city
Ducktown, Atlantic City, district of Atlantic City, New Jersey